Matthew Campbell may refer to:
Matthew Campbell (Australian footballer) (born 1964), former Australian rules footballer with Brisbane and current commentator
Matt Campbell (Australian footballer) (born 1987), current Australian rules footballer with North Melbourne
Matt Campbell (offensive lineman) (born 1972), American football offensive lineman
Matt Campbell (politician) (born 1970), 2010 candidate for Congress in Iowa
Matt Campbell (American football coach) (born 1979), American football coach and former player
Matt Campbell (racing driver) (born 1995), Australian racing car driver
Matthew Campbell (civil servant) (1907–1998), British civil servant
Matthew Campbell (minister) (1823–1897), Baptist preacher
Matt Campbell (darts player) (born 1989), Canadian darts player